North Avenue Presbyterian Church is a historic Presbyterian church at 607 Peachtree Avenue, NE in Atlanta, Georgia. The church building was completed in 1900 and was added to the National Register of Historic Places in 1978.

History 
As the city grew to the north, several Presbyterians felt the need for a new church in the area. The first organizational meeting for the new church were held about 1894 by Mrs. Joseph M. High, Mrs. J. D. McCarty, and Mrs. Clem Harris, who were members of the First Presbyterian Church of Atlanta. The official founding was in December 1898 and included 100 members from First Presbyterian, 15 from Central Presbyterian Church, and one from Athens Presbyterian Church.

In 1909, the church created the North Avenue Presbyterian School, which by 1951 would become The Westminster Schools.

Notable attendees

Roy LeCraw, former Mayor of Atlanta
Tom Cousins, former owner of the Atlanta Hawks and Atlanta Flames, developer of the CNN Center and Omni Coliseum, founder of the East Lake Foundation
Jane Woodruff, philanthropist, daughter of George W. Woodruff, Director of the Coca-Cola Company
James R. Venable, who founded the National Knights of the Ku Klux Klan

References

Bibliography

External links 

 Official Website

Presbyterian churches in Atlanta
Churches on the National Register of Historic Places in Georgia (U.S. state)
Romanesque Revival church buildings in Georgia (U.S. state)
Churches completed in 1900
National Register of Historic Places in Atlanta